Higinia Bartolomé de Alamo (?–?) was a Venezuelan poet and writer from Barquisimeto. A contemporary of professor Alberto Castillo Arráez, she was the wife of Dr. Antonio Alamo (1873-1953), Minister of Development and governor of Bolívar state during the government of Juan Vicente Gómez.

References

Venezuelan women poets
People from Barquisimeto
Year of birth unknown
Year of death unknown
20th-century Venezuelan women writers
20th-century Venezuelan writers